Hetain Patel; (born 1980) is an English visual artist specializing in performance, sculpture, video, and photography. His work has been exhibited in Norway, India, Belgium, and throughout the UK.

Early life 
Patel was born and raised in a working-class British Gujarati Asian household in Bolton, England. He was subjected to racial abuse from his wider community, and found “just walking from the house to the car was difficult.”

As a child Patel developed a keen interest in superhero movies, playing as Spider-man in his grandmother's house. Patel was eager to conceal his ethnic identity using the Spider-man mask stating: “...what I wanted to be most when I grew up was white.”

Work 

In addition to sci-fi and mainstream influenced works, (including work associated with pop-culture superheroes such as Spider-man), Patel experiments with addressing problems of multiculturalism and self-acceptance.

The alienation and racial abuse Patel suffered growing up motivates him to produce art that is inclusive, uplifts and appreciates marginalised groups. As Patel became older a major inspiration was his father, who worked at a day job converting cars, inspiring him to create his first sculpture. Patel converted his first car, gifted by his father in 1997, into his first sculpture Fiesta Transformer. The converted Ford Fiesta sculpture has become a symbol of the working-class. Patel's attraction to fantasticism along with movies such as Transformers influenced his sculpture, hence the title Fiesta Transformer.

Patel's exploration of identity and culture is a key feature and common theme throughout his work. Sacred Bodies(2004/5) is a collection of self-portraits in which Patel tries to better understand his Indian cultural heritage. To create each piece, he covered his upper body in patterns using henna (a pigment used for mehndi) and a red pigment, Kanku, used for markings of cultural importance in Hindu communities.

Patel also uses his art to explore the concepts behind masculinity. Oh Man (2018) was a collaborative project between Contact Youth Company and Hetain Patel which explored both the positive qualities of masculinity and the problems caused by toxic masculinity, as well as trying to understand how perceptions of masculinity can affect people of all genders.

In 2013 he made his debut at TED Global conference in Edinburgh. During his 9 minutes of storytelling, Patel spoke about assumptions and expectations made on how people look like, sound, their heritage, gender or race, and class. Hetain puts emphasis on a fact that even if imitating our role models fails we still might learn and discover ourselves by imitating them.

In 2014, a UK based dance company Candoco known for their disabled and non-disabled performers, has assigned Hetain Patel to create a choreographical art piece. In his first ever commissioned dance choreography Patel brings to the surface social concerns such as representation exploration and identity perception of Candoco's dancers. Lets Talk About Dis challenges viewers in its own playful tone to think beyond boundaries and offers them a courage to be much more honest and transparent about their personalities and communication. However, during 30 minutes, there is not much typically expected dance showing involved. Patel and dancers focuses on delivering a message on diversity, inclusion and improper public correctness. Hetain smartly navigate audience with a minimal spoken word parts of performance, through the fluid usage of three languages: English, French and BSL.

Selected exhibitions

Performance 

 Reflected Identity, Wolverhamptoon Art Gallery, UK, 2005 
 TEN, British Council's Edinburgh Showcase in Edinburgh, UK, 2011 
 Be Like Water, Royal Opera House in London, UK, 2013 
 Let’s Talk About Dis, commission for dance company Condoco in London, UK and national tour, 2014 
 American Boy, Coda Festival in Oslo, Norway, 2015

Films and video 

 Musselm (2006)
 Kankin Raga (2007)
 Its Growing on Me (2008)
 To Dance like your Dad (2009)
 The First Dance (2012)
 Mama (2012)
 Being Chongquing (2012)
 Maestro (2014)
 Heaven & Earth (2014)
 God is a DJ (2014)
 The Jump (2015)
 The Other Suit (2015)
 Don’t look at the Finger (2017)

Sculpture 

 Fiesta Transformer, C-Mine, Genk, Belgium, 2014

Photography 

 Lagan, Bolten Museum and Art Gallery, UK, 2004
 At Home, Chatterjee & Lal, Mumbai, India, and New Art Exchange, Nottingham, UK, 2012 and MAC Birmingham, UK, 2013/14

Other exhibitions 

 Baa's Gold, Copperfield, London, UK, 2021

Education 

 Diploma Foundation Studies in Art and Design, The University of Salford, UK, 2000
 BA Hons Fine Art, The Nottingham Trent University, UK, 2003
 Visiting Lecturer, The Nottingham Trent University, UK, ongoing

Selected awards 

 Decibel Award awarded by Arts Council England, 2004 
 Nottingham Creative Business of the Year, 2008
 Satyajit Ray Short Film Award, 2009
 Jerwood Choreographic Research Project, 2017
 Film London Jarman Award, 2019 
 Best International Film awarded by Kino Der Kunst in Munich, Germany, 2020

References 

British performance artists
British video artists
Living people
1980 births